Hannelore Lucht (unknown – unknown) was a German chess player who won West Germany Women's Chess Championship (1963).

Chess career 
Hannelore Lucht from Dortmund won the West Germany Women's Chess Championship in Krefeld in October 1963 ahead of Anneliese Brandler.

She took second place in the West Germany Women's Chess Championship in 1964 in Bremen behind Irmgard Kärner from Starnberg.

Literature 
 Deutsche Damenmeisterschaft 1963 (German Women's Championship 1963). Schach-Echo 1963, Issue 21, title page 2
 Deutsche Damenmeisterschaft 1964 (German Women's Championship 1964). Schach-Echo 1964, Issue 19, title page 2, as well as pages 318 and 329/30 (games)

Sources 
 Bulletin of the 18th German Women's Championship, Bremen 27.9. – 10.10.1964
 German Women's Chess Championships: reports, photos and overview since 1939 from Gerhard Hund

References 

Year of birth missing
Year of death missing
German female chess players